The Moose Creek Administrative Site, in the vicinity of Grangeville, Idaho, was listed on the National Register of Historic Places in 1990.

It is located at the confluence of the Selway River and Moose Creek in the Selway-Bitterroot Wilderness.  The listing included nine contributing buildings and one other contributing structure.

References

Park buildings and structures on the National Register of Historic Places in Idaho
Idaho County, Idaho